Lee Byung-hun (born July 12, 1970) is a South Korean actor.

Film

Television series

Web series

Web shows

Documentary

Narration

Music video appearance

Others

Notes

References

South Korean filmographies